Stony Hollow, MP 8.3 on the Ulster and Delaware Railroad, was a small, station-agent-lacking flagstop/shelter that served the small town of Stony Hollow, between West Hurley and Kingston, New York, and had very little business. It was located halfway up the Hurley Mountain Grade, and was next to the Route 28A bridge crossing. Because of low traffic at this station, it was eventually closed and torn down.

Railway stations in the Catskill Mountains
Former Ulster and Delaware Railroad stations
Railway stations in Ulster County, New York
Former railway stations in New York (state)